The list of Texas A&M University presidents includes the previous presidents of Texas A&M University. As of August 2021, the president is Katherine Banks.

Presidents

External links
Presidents of the Agricultural & Mechanical College of Texas & Texas A&M University

Presidents
Texas Aandm
Texas education-related lists